Camp Okavango Airstrip  is a private airstrip serving Camp Okavango, a safari camp in the Okavango Delta, in the North-West District of Botswana.

See also

Transport in Botswana
List of airports in Botswana

References

External links 
OpenStreetMap - Camp Okavango
OurAirports - Camp Okavango
Fallingrain - Camp Okavango Airport

Airports in Botswana